Albert Gendelshtein (Альберт Александрович Гендельштейн 4 April 1906, Kiev, Ukraine - 25 March 1981) was a Soviet film director known for the movies Lermontov, and Love and Hate (1935) with an early score by Shostakovich.

References

1906 births
1981 deaths
Soviet film directors